Beverly Castillo is a politician from Belize. In November 2015, Castillo was appointed by Prime Minister Dean Barrow to be a Belize Minister of State in the Ministry of Immigration. Previously, Castillo was the Chief Executive Officer of the Ministry of Natural Resources. Castillo, a member of the United Democratic Party (UDP) was elected to the House of Representative in the November 2015 General Election for the Belize Rural Central constituency.

References 

Belizean politicians
House of Representatives (Belize)